Let's Have a Party is a studio album by American recording artist Wanda Jackson. It was released in 1982 via K-tel and contained 18 tracks. It was the twenty eighth studio album released in Jackson's music career. Half of the album consisted of re-recordings, including the former singles like the title track and "Right or Wrong". Additional material was new cuts by Jackson previously not included in her discography.

Background, content and release
For several decades, Wanda Jackson became among the first female Rockabilly and country music artists, having commercial success with singles like "Let's Have a Party", "In the Middle of a Heartache" and "Tears Will Be the Chaser for Your Wine". Discovering gospel music in the 1970s, she switched record labels, which led to declining sales success. For a time, she retreated to domestic life in the late 1970s before resuming her career in the next decade. She recorded a series of albums during this time for various independent labels. Let's Have a Party was among the albums Jackson recorded during the early 1980s. It was a collection of 18 tracks, seven of which were re-recordings. Some songs had previously been released as singles and were among Jackson's best-known hits: the title track, "Right or Wrong", "In the Middle of a Heartache", "A Woman Lives for Love" and "Fancy Satin Pillows". 

Three tracks were also re-recordings but had only previously been album cuts on Jackson's albums. The first was her newly re-recorded cover of "Crazy". Her first version of the song was recorded for her 1972 studio album I Wouldn't Want You Any Other Way. The second was a cover of "Is It Wrong (For Loving You)", which was first featured on Jackson's 1962 album Wonderful Wanda. The third was a cover of "Stupid Cupid", which was first featured on her 1961 album. Let's Have a Party was released in 1982 on K-tel as a vinyl LP. It was produced by Jack Johnson at the Audio Media Recorders Studio. In her autobiography, Jackson reflected on the album, commenting that the project was "not particularly inspired".

Track listing

Personnel
All credits are adapted from the liner notes of Let's Have a Party.

Musical personnel
 Dennis Burnside – Piano
 Jerry Kroon – Drums
 Wanda Jackson – Lead vocals
 Jack Johnson – Bass
 Sheldon Kurland Strings – String section
 Larry Sassler – Steel guitar
 Paul Worley – Guitar

Technical personnel
 Jack Johnson – Producer

Release history

References

1982 albums
Wanda Jackson albums
K-tel albums